The 2021 CMT Music Awards, the 55th edition of the awards ceremony, were held in Nashville, Tennessee on June 9, 2021. Kane Brown and Kelsea Ballerini were hosts of the ceremony.

Background 
The CMT Music Awards are a fan-voted awards show for country music videos and television performances; Voting takes place on CMT's website. The CMT Music Awards is the oldest MTV awards show, dating its history to the 1967 Music City News Awards. MTV acquired the awards show in 2000. This was the second time the on Duo/Group video of the year category has been combined since 2016.

Winners and nominees 
Winners are shown in bold.

Performers 
On May 26, CMT announced some performers for the 2021 CMT Music Awards. The final performers were announced on June 7. Maren Morris and Gabby Barrett were previously announced as performers but both backed out; the former was replaced by Ingrid Andress and the latter by Lindsay Ell.

Presenters 
The following have been announced as presenters for the ceremony:
 Anthony Mackie
 Brett Young
 Busy Philipps
 Carly Pearce
 Dylan Scott
 Gladys Knight
 Iliza Shlesinger
 Little Big Town
 Michael Strahan
 Mickey Guyton
 Restless Road
 Trace Adkins
 Taylor Lewan
 Cody Alan, Katie Cook and Ashley ShahAhmadi

References 

2021 music awards
2021 awards in the United States
CMT Music Awards
June 2021 events in the United States
2021 in Tennessee